Elkhorn Mountain  is a mountain located in the Elk River Mountains of the Vancouver Island Ranges of British Columbia, Canada.

Location
Elkhorn is one of the most accessible of the tall mountains on the Island as it is only a one-hour drive from Campbell River to the head of the Elk River trail.  It is only a half-hour walk along the Elk River Trail (AKA: ERT) to a small campsite where one crosses the Elk River and starts a steep ascent up into the alpine. 
Above treeline, one has a view of the objective, a steep and dominant hornlike peak that presents parties with a variety of routes. The most popular ascent route is the North West Ridge, although not the easiest (the West Face is) it has the aesthetics of a classic which is only fitting as it is the original, first ascent route.
Elkhorn can also be accessed further up the ERT from the upper gravel flats which is home to the main campsite along the ERT. The route that leaves at the upper gravel flats is not in near as good shape, although if late in the year a dry stream bed can be followed for a large portion of the approach.

History
The peak was first ascended in 1912 by A.O Wheeler, Edward Wheeler, Albert MacCarthy, D.A. Gillies, A.R. Hart, J.R. Robertson, H.O. Frind, L.C. Wilson and F.A. Robertson of the Alpine Club of Canada.  For many years there was speculation about whether or not Elkhorn, earlier known as Strathcona's Matterhorn, might be the highest mountain on the island. The question of "was Elkhorn once the highest peak on the island" has since been resolved.

Noticeable ascents include the first winter ascent on March 24, 1968, by Peter Busch and Alastair Watt via the Northwest Ridge, the first ascent of the North Ridge by Joe Bajan, Stewart Wozny, Dave Smith and Tom Muirhead in 1972, the North Face on June 18, 1977, by Joe Bajan and Peter Busch and a sub 4 hour speed ascent by Lindsay Elms on August 21, 1992.

See also
List of mountains in Strathcona Provincial Park
List of mountains of Canada

References

Sources

External links

Two-thousanders of British Columbia
Vancouver Island Ranges
Nootka Land District